The 2010–11 BBL season was the 24th campaign of the British Basketball League since the league's establishment in 1987. This season saw the league reduced to 12 teams with the withdrawal of London Capital during the summer and was the first campaign ever to not feature a club from the capital city London.

Unlike previous seasons the Trophy schedule usually played in January/February was brought forward, with the reintroduced group stage being played before the start of the regular season. The campaign tipped-off on 17 September 2010 with Plymouth Raiders beating Worthing Thunder 79–77 in the opening game of the Trophy. The regular league season commenced on 10 October, whilst the season closed with the showpiece Play-off Final on 30 April 2011 at the National Indoor Arena in Birmingham.

Newly rebranded Mersey Tigers won three out of the four domestic titles on offer, finishing victorious in the Franklin & Marshall Trophy, Championship and post-season Play-offs, whilst missing out on the BBL Cup following a 93–66 loss to Sheffield Sharks in the Final. Mersey's Tony Garbelotto was named as BBL Coach of the Year, whilst Cheshire Jets' Jeremy Bell was awarded the BBL's MVP award.

Teams

Notable occurrences 
 After a season-long review which evaluated both the on and off-court performance of the franchise, it was announced prior to the season opening that London Capital were withdrawn from the BBL and would instead compete in the English Basketball League.
 Following Everton F.C.'s decision to cut their ties with the Tigers franchise, the team was relaunched as the Mersey Tigers prior to the start of the season along with the announcement that the Echo Arena would serve as their home venue for the first eight home games of the season.
 With further delays added to the arena:mk construction, Milton Keynes Lions sought to solve their on-going venue problems by acquiring a warehouse facility in downtown Milton Keynes to convert into a new home venue. The Lions used a court at Stoke Mandeville until the new facility – MK Lions Arena – opened midway through the season.
 Aside from Tigers and Milton Keynes, two other franchises uprooted and moved to new venues for the start of the season. After 15 years of playing out of the Metro Radio Arena, Newcastle Eagles swapped to the newly built 3,000-seat Sport Central facility at Northumbria University, whilst Guildford Heat also uprooted to the new Surrey Sports Park after 5 years at the Guildford Spectrum.
 The season started with a differing structure from previous years with the campaign tipping-off with the opening rounds of the BBL Trophy instead of regular season championship games. The decision gained a mixed reaction from coaches, with many of whom using the games as warm-ups for the regular season.
 After several years without television coverage, the League announced on 20 October that a deal had been struck with leading broadcaster Sky Sports to screen one "as live" game a week starting from 2 November, including a live broadcast of the BBL Cup Final.
 Cheshire Jets forward Matt Schneck was suspended in November after he had failed a drugs test, after traces of a prohibited substance known as Methylhexaneamine were found in his system. The player could have faced a two-year ban, but this was later reduced to three months making it the shortest ban ever handed out to an athlete for ingesting Methylhexanaemine.
 The Guildford Heat franchise was put up for sale amid a shortfall of funding, it was revealed in December, with the price of the club valued at just £1.
 In a bid to save the Guildford franchise from folding, fans of the club launched a campaign to raise £25,000 in 25 days throughout January.
 It was announced in January 2011 that this season's Trophy Final would be held at the O2 Arena, in partnership with the NBA as part of its 'Basketball Week', culminating in the Toronto Raptors versus New Jersey Nets game being played in March.
 The League announced in January that an agreement had been reached with clothing company Franklin & Marshall to sponsor the BBL Trophy Final, which would be held in March at the O2 Arena as part of the NBA's 'Basketball Week'.
 Sheffield Sharks retained the BBL Cup with a massive 93–66 win over Mersey Tigers in the Final at the National Indoor Arena in Birmingham on 16 January 2011. Sharks' American import Steve Dagostino scored 35 points and was named as the game's MVP. The game was broadcast live on Sky Sports.
 Newcastle's Kadiri Richard was crowned 2011 Slam Dunk Champion, after pipping second-place Stefan Gill (Milton Keynes) to win the annual Slam Dunk Competition on 16 January, at the National Indoor Arena.
 Surrey-based businesswoman Allison Reeve bought out the financially troubled Guildford Heat franchise in January, becoming the League's first female owner, and saving the franchise from 'imminent closure'.
 It was revealed by the media in February that Mersey Tigers had failed to pay wages to players and staff due to ongoing financial difficulties. The club released a statement about the situation, citing loss of two major sponsors and debts from previous ownership as the main reasons for its decision to delay salary payments and to relocate to temporary home venues in Liverpool and Manchester.
 Essex Pirates' 90–94 overtime victory at Worthing Thunder, on 19 February, was their first and only win of the season.
 Mersey Tigers claimed their first Franklin & Marshal Trophy title with an 84–66 victory over Guildford Heat on 5 March, at the O2 Arena in London. Tigers' Andrew Thomson scored a game-high 21 points, whilst Andrew Sullivan was awarded the Final's MVP award.
 The Championship title came down to the final game of the season, played out between Mersey Tigers and Newcastle Eagles at Sport Central on 6 April. The winner of the game would be crowned Champions and after a close contest Mersey claimed their first championship title with an 80–75 victory. Mersey were the first all-British qualified side to win the title in the BBL's 23-year history.
 Following the end of the regular season, Worthing Thunder officials confirmed that, due to financial problems, they would be withdrawing the franchise from the BBL immediately and have entered the English Basketball League for the forthcoming season.
 At the end of the season, long-serving veteran Tony Windless announced his retirement from playing basketball at the age of 41, after a career that saw him play all but two of his 16 professional seasons in the BBL, debuting with London Towers in 1994 and winning every major domestic prize.
 Newcastle's Trey Moore was crowned as the Basketball Journalists Association's (BJA) BBL Player of the Year, despite being ruled out by injury in March. Tony Garbelotto of Mersey Tigers, was awarded Coach of the Year.
 In the annual NIA All-Star Game, the Rest of the World All-Stars ran out 119–115 winners over the Great Britain All-Stars at the National Indoor Arena, in Birmingham on 30 April. Newcastle's Kadiri Richard, playing for the Rest of the World All-Stars, was awarded the MVP title after scoring 14 points, 10 rebounds and 9 assists.
 Despite going through most of the season with unpaid wages, Mersey Tigers reached the Play-off Final for the second consecutive year and beat Sheffield Sharks 79–74 to take the BBL Play-off title, their third piece of silverware this season. James Jones was named as the Final's MVP.

BBL Championship (Tier 1)

Final standings

The play-offs

Quarter-finals 1st Leg

Quarter-finals 2nd Leg 

Cheshire Jets won series on aggregate (177–164), as did Mersey Tigers (181–176), Newcastle Eagles (192–180) and Sheffield Sharks (162–156).

Semi-finals 1st Leg

Semi-finals 2nd Leg 

Mersey Tigers won 165–143 on aggregate and Sheffield Sharks won 166–154 on aggregate.

Final

EBL National League Division 1 (Tier 2)

Final standings

EBL National League Division 2 (Tier 3)

Final standings

BBL Cup

1st round

Quarter-finals

Semi-finals 1st Leg

Semi-finals 2nd Leg 

Mersey Tigers win 204–182 on aggregate and Sheffield Sharks won 204–165 on aggregate.

Final

Franklin & Marshall Trophy

Group stage 

Group 1

Group 3

Group 2

Group 4

Semi-finals 1st Leg

Semi-finals 2nd Leg 

Guildford Heat win 172–159 on aggregate and Mersey Tigers won 204–182 on aggregate.

Final

NIA All-Star Game

Statistics leaders

Monthly awards

Seasonal awards 

 Molten Most Valuable Player: Jeremy Bell (Cheshire Jets)
 Molten Coach of the Year: Tony Garbelotto (Mersey Tigers)
 Team of the Year:
 Trey Moore (Newcastle Eagles)
 Jeremy Bell (Cheshire Jets)
 Charles Smith (Newcastle Eagles)
 Quemont Greer (Cheshire Jets)
 Andrew Sullivan (Mersey Tigers)
 Defensive Team of the Year:
 Reggie Jackson (Newcastle Eagles)
 Demarius Bolds (Milton Keynes Lions)
 Andrew Sullivan (Mersey Tigers)
 Kadiri Richard (Newcastle Eagles)
 Tafari Toney (Mersey Tigers)
 British Team of the Year:
 Nate Reinking (Mersey Tigers)
 Andrew Sullivan (Mersey Tigers)
 Anthony Rowe (Plymouth Raiders)
 Andrew Thomson (Mersey Tigers)
 Tafari Toney (Mersey Tigers)

References 

British Basketball League seasons
1
British